The 2009 Albanian Women's National Championship was the 1st season of women's league football under the Albanian Football Association, played after several unofficial tournaments, which were staged as promotion for women's football in Albania.

The competition was played in a knock-out tournament over 5 days, with 8 teams participating. Tirana AS won the title, beating Juban Danja 4–0 in the final.

Results

Quarter-finals
All matches were played on 23 January 2009, with two played at Selman Stërmasi Stadium in Tirana and two at the National Sports Centre in Kamëz.

Semi-finals

Final

References

External links
 Albania (women) 2009 RSSSF.com
 Tirana A.S fituese e Turneut kombetar te futbollit te femrave 29 January 2009, FSHF (via Internet Archive)

Albania
Albanian Women's National Championship
Albanian Women's National Championship seasons